The Egyptian Exchange (EGX), Egypt's stock exchange, comprises two exchanges, Cairo and Alexandria, both governed by the same board of directors and sharing the same trading, clearing and settlement systems. Presently, the chairman of the Egyptian Exchange is Mohamed Farid.

Transactions taking place in the stock exchange is not subject to capital gain tax. Dividends distributed by companies listed on the exchange to shareholders are not subject to tax. However, in 2013, a 10% capital gain tax applicable on mergers and acquisitions was imposed on the exchange. In 2013, Finance Ministry announced that the government intended to cancel a 10 percent capital gains tax imposed on mergers and acquisitions as well as a planned tax on cash dividends.

The Egyptian stock exchange plummeted 6.25% following the beginning of the Egyptian revolution of 2011 on 25 January.  It closed at the end of trading on 27 January after the benchmark EGX 30 Index (EGX30) plunged 16 percent that week amid the uprising. The exchange reopened on Wednesday 23 March after being closed for almost 8 weeks. The market fell by a further 8.9% on reopening.

The Egyptian Exchange is a member of the Federation of Euro-Asian Stock Exchanges.

See also
CASE 30
List of African stock exchanges
List of stock exchanges
List of stock market indices

References

External links

Financial services companies established in 1883
Stock exchanges in the Middle East
Stock exchanges in Africa
Finance in Egypt
Organisations based in Cairo
Economy of Cairo
Economy of Alexandria
1883 establishments in Egypt